Creepy is something that causes an unpleasant feeling of fear or unease.  

Creepy may also refer to:

Arts and entertainment
Creepy (band), an indie rock/pop punk band
Creepy (film), a 2016 Japanese film
Creepy (magazine), a horror comics magazine published from 1964 to 1983

People
Creepy Crespi (1918-1990), American Major League Baseball player
Creepy, nickname of Alvin Karpis (1907-1979), Canadian-born American gangster 
Creepy, nickname of John Crawley (born 1971), English cricketer
"Uncle Creepy", nickname of Ian McCall (born 1984), American mixed martial artist

See also
Creep (disambiguation)
The Creepy EP, an EP by Relient K

Lists of people by nickname